Jangseong County (Jangseong-gun) is a county in South Jeolla Province, South Korea.

Jangseong is in the southern region of the Korean peninsula and Gwangju and Naju is the nearest city from Jangseong. In South Jeolla, it near the northern border of its province, meeting North Jeolla.

Jangseong is assumed to be the birthplace of Hong Gildong. The festival host bowing place with local river. Hong Gildong festival was chosen as superior festival of South Jeolla.

The Republic of Korea Army Armor School is located in the county.

Climate

Symbols
 Flower : White poplar
 Tree : Maple
 Bird : Dove

May 2014 fire
A fire at a 397-bed hospital, which had opened in 2007 in Jangseong was the scene of a major fire just after midnight on 28 May 2014. Twenty one patients and a nurse died in the fire, while several more people were injured.

Twin towns – sister cities
Jangseong is twinned with:

  Jung-gu, South Korea  
  Haman County, South Korea  
  Gwacheon, South Korea

References

External links
County government home page

 
Counties of South Jeolla Province